There have been two highways in New Brunswick numbered Route 6:
New Brunswick Route 6 (1927-1965), now Route 110
New Brunswick Route 6 (1965-1984), now Route 106